Muhan Hasi (an ethnic Kazakh born 27 November 1989 in Xinjiang province) is a male Chinese long-distance runner. He competed in the marathon event at the 2015 World Championships in Athletics in Beijing, China.

See also
 China at the 2015 World Championships in Athletics

References

Chinese male long-distance runners
Living people
Place of birth missing (living people)
1989 births
World Athletics Championships athletes for China
Runners from Xinjiang